Angelo Drossos (October 31, 1928 – January 9, 1997) was the owner of the San Antonio Spurs basketball team from 1973 to 1988, from its time in the American Basketball Association through the ABA-NBA merger and into its years in the National Basketball Association. Drossos received the NBA Executive of the Year Award in 1978 and was instrumental in bringing the three-point field goal to the NBA. He died at age 68 in 1997 after battling supranuclear palsy.

Notes

1928 births
1997 deaths
American Basketball Association executives
National Basketball Association executives
National Basketball Association owners
San Antonio Spurs executives
20th-century American businesspeople